Judy Jacobson (February 26, 1939 – June 20, 2019) was an American author and politician who served as a Democratic member of the Montana Legislature. She was elected to Montana State Senate District 42 and served from 1981 to 1996, and was the first female Senator serving Silver Bow County.

Early life and education 
On February 26, 1939, Jacobson was born in South Bend, Indiana. Jacobson attended and studied social work at the University of Wisconsin. In 1995, Jacobson earned a Bachelor of Science degree from Montana Technological University.

Career 
In 1981, Jacobson served in the Montana Senate District 41.

On January 12, 1996, Jacobson was announced as the running mate of Chet Blaylock for the 1996 Montana gubernatorial election. However, on October 23, 1996, Blaylock died of a heart attack, and the Montana Democratic Party selected his running mate, Jacobson, to replace him as the gubernatorial nominee, and she therefore appeared on the ballot as both the gubernatorial nominee and the lieutenant gubernatorial nominee. Winning 79.2% of the vote, ultimately, however, Marc Racicot was able to defeat Jacobson in a landslide to win re-election to his second and final term as governor.

In 2000, Jacobson became the first woman Chief Executive of Butte-Silver Bow in Montana.

Works 
 1997 Montana Almanc. Co-author with Andrea Merrill. Published by Falcon Press Publishing.

Personal life 
Jacobson's husband is John Jacobson, a physician. In 1973, Jacobson and her family moved to Butte, Montana. Jacobson has three children. On June 20, 2019, Jacobson died in Butte at 80 years of age.

References

External links 
 Judy Jacobson at ourcampaigns.com

1939 births
2019 deaths
20th-century American women politicians
20th-century American politicians
Democratic Party Montana state senators
Politicians from South Bend, Indiana
University of Wisconsin-Madison School of Social Work alumni
Women state legislators in Montana
21st-century American women